Gundrampally or Gundrampalli is a village in Nalgonda district in Telangana, India. It falls under Chityala mandal.

In 1948 during the Telangana Rebellion, Gundrampally was the site of a major revolt by the villagers against the Nizam of Hyderabad's rule and the widespread massacres of villagers by Razakars of Hyderabad who killed more than 350 villagers and raped innumerable women. There was a large Razakar camp at Gundrampally from where they had killed a large number of villagers. In retaliation, the camp was attacked and destroyed.
In 1993, the villagers built a memorial Stupa to commemorate the martyrs.

References

Gundrampally, an icon of Telangana armed struggle: https://telanganatoday.com/gundrampally-icon-telangana-armed-struggle

Villages in Nalgonda district
Telangana Rebellion
Revolutionary movement for Indian independence
Persecution of Hindus